Michael G. Bryson (August 22, 1942 – May 22, 2012) was a news and sports reporter and editor from Des Moines, Iowa and the elder brother of travel writer Bill Bryson. He co-authored a book The Babe Didn't Point: And Other Stories About Iowans and Sports with his son Michael G. Bryson Jr in 1989. He wrote The Twenty-Four-Inch Home Run in 1990.

Bryson was an editor and associate publisher of the Sun Press Newspapers in Hawaii from 1979 to 1986. He covered the New York Mets in 1969 while a sports reporter for the Associated Press. He was a news reporter for the Des Moines Register and Tribune from 1970 to 1979. He attended Drake University.

References 

1942 births
2012 deaths
American sportswriters
American sports journalists
Drake University alumni
20th-century American non-fiction writers
Writers from Des Moines, Iowa